MeKaDo was a German girl group that represented Germany at the Eurovision Song Contest 1994 with their song Wir geben 'ne Party. The group consisted of Melanie Bender, Kati Karney and Dorkas Kiefer.  

The group name comes from  the first two letters of the first name of each member.  

German musical groups
Eurovision Song Contest entrants for Germany
Eurovision Song Contest entrants of 1994